The Statute Law Revision Act 1959 (7 & 8 Eliz 2 c 68) was an Act of the Parliament of the United Kingdom.

This Act was repealed by section 1 of, and Part XI of the Schedule to the Statute Law (Repeals) Act 1974.

The enactments which were repealed (whether for the whole or any part of the United Kingdom) by this Act were repealed so far as they extended to the Isle of Man on 25 July 1991.

The effect of this Act is set out in the Report of the Joint Committee on Consolidation Bills dated 24 June 1959.

Section 3 - Saving for powers of Parliament of Northern Ireland
This section was repealed by section 41(1) of, and Part I of Schedule 6 to, the Northern Ireland Constitution Act 1973.

Acts of Parliament repealed by this Act

Miscellaneous

Army prize and savings bank

Colonial and other loans

Legal procedure

Road and rail transport

See also
Statute Law Revision Act.

References
Halsbury's Statutes,
The Public General Acts and Church Assembly Measures 1959. HMSO. London. 1959. Page 1128.
HC Deb vol 609, cols  1719 to 1720.

External links

United Kingdom Acts of Parliament 1959